The 1928–29 SK Rapid Wien season was the 31st season in club history.

Squad

Squad and statistics

Squad statistics

Fixtures and results

League

Cup

Mitropa Cup

References

1928-29 Rapid Wien Season
Rapid
Austrian football championship-winning seasons